Presbyterian Church is a church at 2002 Franklin Street in Bellevue, Nebraska, USA, that was built c.1856-58, and has been believed to be the oldest surviving building in Nebraska that was built to hold religious services. It is also believed to be one of few surviving buildings in Nebraska that show original Greek Revival architectural influence.

The congregation of the church was founded in 1859 and, in 1970, was believed to be the oldest church congregation in the state.

The church was added to the National Register in 1970.

References

External links
More photos of the church at Wikimedia Commons

Presbyterian churches in Nebraska
Churches on the National Register of Historic Places in Nebraska
Greek Revival church buildings in Nebraska
Italianate architecture in Nebraska
Churches completed in 1858
Buildings and structures in Bellevue, Nebraska
Tourist attractions in Sarpy County, Nebraska
National Register of Historic Places in Sarpy County, Nebraska